Thorp Arch is a village and civil parish near Wetherby, West Yorkshire, England in the City of Leeds metropolitan borough.

It sits in the Wetherby ward of Leeds City Council and Elmet and Rothwell parliamentary constituency.

The village is on the north bank of the River Wharfe which separates it from Boston Spa to the south. It has a primary school and public house. Historically the parish of Thorp Arch was in the Ainsty, a division of Yorkshire separate from the ridings.  It had a population of 1,123 in 2001, increasing to 1,591 at the 2011 census.

The village is adjacent to Thorp Arch Trading Estate, Wealstun Prison, and the British Library Document Supply Centre.

The village railway station, now closed, was next to the trading estate on the closed Harrogate to Church Fenton Line. Current day public transport is provided by bus route 7 to Harrogate, Wetherby and Leeds, operated by The Harrogate Bus Company.

Leeds United's training ground and academy are based on Walton Road. The facility was opened in 1990 to replace one adjacent to the club's Elland Road football stadium in Leeds.

Location grid

See also
Listed buildings in Thorp Arch

References

External links

Places in Leeds
Villages in West Yorkshire
Civil parishes in West Yorkshire